Proterovaginoceras (Ancient Greek for "earlier shield horn") is a medium to large sized endocerid (endocone-bearing orthoconic nautiliod) from the Early and Middle Ordovician included in the  family Endoceratidae.

Proterovaginoceras has a straight shell with a circular cross section, straight sutures, and a ventral to central, nanno-type, siphuncle which fills the entire apical part of the shell. Septal necks are macrochoanitic, up to two camerae (chambers) long; connecting rings, one chamber in length line the inside of the necks. Endocones are long and slender, fill the entire bulbous, nanno-end, of the siphuncle.

Proterovaginoceras was named by Reudemann in 1905. Dideroceras Flower 1950 and Chisloceras Gortani 1934 are probably synonymous equivalents.

Distribution 
Fossils of the genus have been found in:
 Loobu Formation, Estonia
 Abastu Formation, Iran
 Pivorjaiskaja Formation, Lithuania
 Huk and Stein Formations, Norway
 Gillberga, Holen and Komstad Formations, Sweden
 China

References

Further reading 

 O. K. Bogolepova, B. Kröger, M. Falahatgar and M. Javidan. 2014. Middle Ordovician cephalopods from the Abarsaj area, northern Iran. GFF - Geological Society of Sweden 136(1):34-37
 B. Kröger. 2014. Middle Ordovician cephalopod biofacies and palaeoenvironments of Baltoscandia. Lethaia
 B. Kröger. 2012. The 'Vaginaten': the dominant cephalopods of the Baltoscandian Mid Ordovician endocerid limestone. Geologiska Föreningen i Stockholm Förhandlingar 134(2):115-132
 H. Mutvei. 1997. Siphuncular structure in Ordovician endocerid cephalopods. Acta Palaeontologica Polonica 42(3):375-390
 J. Laskovas, V. Marcinkevicius, and J. Paskevicius. 1993. The Stratigraphy and Structure of Ordovician Rocks of the South - East Part of the Baltic Basin (Druksiu Area). Geologija, Detailed Stratigraphy (14)81-98
 Tiechert,C. 1964. Endoceratoidea. Treatise on Invertebrate Paleontology, Part K. Endoceratoidea, Actinoceratoidea, Nautiloidea. Geological Soc. of America and Univ Kansas Press

External links 
 Proterovaginoceras in the Paleobiology Database

Nautiloids
Darriwilian
Ordovician cephalopods
Ordovician animals of Asia
Paleozoic Iran
Fossils of Iran
Ordovician animals of Europe
Paleozoic Estonia
Fossils of Estonia
Paleozoic Lithuania
Fossils of Lithuania
Ordovician Norway
Fossils of Norway
Ordovician Sweden
Fossils of Sweden
Fossil taxa described in 1905
Ordovician China